KFLO may refer to:

 The ICAO code for Florence Regional Airport in Florence, South Carolina, United States
 KFLO-LP, a low-power radio station (102.9 FM) licensed to Jonesboro, Arkansas, United States
 KFLO-FM, a radio station (89.1 FM) licensed to Blanchard, Louisiana, United States
 KSYB, a radio station (1300 AM) licensed to Shreveport, Louisiana, which used the call sign KFLO until July 2002